Russia competed at the 2000 Summer Paralympics in Sydney, Australia. 89 competitors from Russia won 35 medals, including 12 gold, 11 silver and 12 bronze to finish 14th in the medal table.

Medal table

Medallists

Basketball ID 
Russia originally earned a silver medal after being defeated by Spain in the gold medal match. However, Spain were stripped of their gold medal after cheating in the game which lead to Russia gaining a gold medal and Poland earning the silver.

See also 
 Russia at the Paralympics
 Russia at the 2000 Summer Olympics

References 

2000
2000 in Russian sport
Nations at the 2000 Summer Paralympics